Stanley Bruce Herschensohn (September 10, 1932 – November 30, 2020) was an American conservative political commentator, author, and senior fellow at the Pepperdine University School of Public Policy in Malibu, California.

Herschensohn quickly rose to prominence in the Republican Party, becoming a consultant to the Republican National Convention in 1972 and joined the Nixon administration on September 11, 1972. He served primarily as a speech writer. He left following Nixon's resignation, but served on the Ronald Reagan Presidential Transition Team and as an official in the Reagan administration.

Previously, Herschensohn had been a Distinguished Fellow at the Claremont Institute and a fellow at the Institute of Politics at Harvard's John F. Kennedy School of Government in Cambridge, Massachusetts. He had taught politics at the University of Maryland, Whittier College and at Pepperdine University's School of Public Policy.

Early life
Herschensohn attended University High School in Los Angeles. He then joined the United States Air Force and served 1951–1952.

Political campaigns

Unsuccessful 1986 U.S. Senate primary campaign
In 1986, Herschensohn unsuccessfully sought the Republican nomination for the United States Senate seat held by Democrat Alan Cranston. He finished far ahead of the crowded pack in most of Southern California but finished second statewide to Silicon Valley Representative Ed Zschau, who won the nomination by plurality.

1992 U.S. Senate election

In 1992, when Cranston retired, Herschensohn won the Republican nomination narrowly, defeating U.S. Representative Tom Campbell, a more moderate Republican who had been on the faculty of Stanford University and who had been elected to Zschau's former Congressional seat. Herschensohn received 956,136 votes (38.2 percent) to Campbell's 895,970 (35.8 percent). The remaining 417,848 ballots (16.7 percent) went to Mayor Sonny Bono of Palm Springs, also a relative moderate. During the primary campaign and afterwards, Herschensohn became a close friend of Bono and encouraged his former rival to seek election to the United States House of Representatives in 1994.

Herschensohn lost the 1992 general election to the Democratic Party nominee Barbara Boxer, but received over one million votes more than the Republican presidential ticket of George H. W. Bush and Dan Quayle received in California during the same election. Herschensohn won more votes than any losing Senate candidate had ever gotten at the time, topping the count of Leo McCarthy (D-CA) in 1988. His record wasn't broken until Elizabeth Emken topped it in the 2012 California Senate race.

Career

 RKO Pictures, Los Angeles
 Studio messenger, 1950–51
In art department, 1953–55
United States Air Force, 1951–52
General Dynamics Corp., Convair Division, San Diego, California, film maker and director, 1955–56
Self-employed film director, producer, and writer in Los Angeles, 1956–68
Director, John F. Kennedy: Years of Lightning, Day of Drums (1964)
Member of board of trustees of American Film Institute, 1967
U.S. delegation to International Film Festival
Chairman of delegation, Czechoslovakia, 1968
Member of delegation in U.S.S.R., 1969
U.S. Information Agency, Washington, D.C., director of Motion Picture and Television Service, 1968–72
Instructor for "U.S. Image Abroad" at the University of Maryland, 1972
Member of board of governors of Charles Edison Memorial Youth Foundation
Consultant to 1972 Republican National Convention
White House, Washington, D.C. (Richard Nixon administration)
Staff assistant to president, 1972–73
Deputy special assistant, 1973–74
Self-employed film director, producer, and writer, 1975–76
Freelance writer, 1976–2020
Ronald Reagan Presidential Transition Team, 1980
Political commentator for Los Angeles KABC-TV radio and TV stations, 1978–1991
Senior Fellow, School of Public Policy at Pepperdine University, 2006–2020
Nonresident Associate Fellow, Nixon Center
Board of directors, Center for Individual Freedom

Authorship

 The Gods of Antenna, Arlington House. (1976)
 Lost Trumpets: A Conservative's Map to America's Destiny, The Claremont Institute Press, Claremont, California. (1994)
 Hong Kong at the Handover (Editor), Lexington Books, Lanham, Maryland. (1999)
  Across the Taiwan Strait: Democracy: The Bridge Between Mainland China and Taiwan (Editor), Lexington Books. (2002)
 
 
 
 
 
 Author of films:
 "Tall Man Five-Five", (Strategic Air Command)
 "Karma", International Communications Foundation
 "The President", U.S. Information Agency
 "Bridges of the Barrios", U.S. Information Agency
 "The Five Cities of June", U.S. Information Agency
 "John F. Kennedy: Years of Lightning, Day of Drums", U.S. Information Agency
 "Eulogy to 5:02", U.S. Information Agency
 Contributor of stories to, among others:
 Conservative Digest
 Newsday
 Newsweek
 Human Events
 Saturday Evening Post

Awards

 Arthur S. Flemming Award, 1969
 Academy Award from Academy of Motion Picture Arts and Sciences, 1970, for short documentary film "Czechoslovakia: 1968"
 Academy Award nominations, 1969 and 1972
 Distinguished service award from U.S. Information Agency, 1972
 Award from Council Against Communist Aggression, 1972

Notes

References

External links
 Brief Bio on Pepperdine University website
 

1932 births
2020 deaths
American Jews
Television personalities from Los Angeles
Assistants to the President of the United States
California Republicans
American commentators
Human Events people
Harvard Kennedy School faculty
Nixon administration personnel
Writers from Los Angeles
Pepperdine University faculty
Politicians from Milwaukee
Military personnel from Milwaukee
United States Air Force airmen
People of the United States Information Agency
Writers from Milwaukee
Washington, D.C., Republicans
Candidates in the 1992 United States elections
Candidates in the 1986 United States elections
American political writers
20th-century American male writers
20th-century American non-fiction writers
21st-century American male writers
21st-century American non-fiction writers
University High School (Los Angeles) alumni